The Shire of Romsey was a local government area about  north-north-west of Melbourne, the state capital of Victoria, Australia.

History

Romsey was incorporated as a road district on 5 August 1862, and became a shire on 16 June 1871.

On 10 January 1890, the Shire of Lancefield was created from parts of the Lancefield and Rochford Ridings. However, it and the Shire of Springfield were united with Romsey on 31 May 1916. Parts of Romsey was annexed to the Shire of Kilmore on 28 May 1958.

On 19 January 1995, the Shire of Romsey was abolished, and along with the Shires of Gisborne, Kyneton and Newham and Woodend, was merged into the newly created Shire of Macedon Ranges.

Wards

The Shire of Romsey was divided into four ridings on 7 February 1978, each of which elected three councillors:
 Central Riding
 Lancefield Riding
 Riddell Riding
 Romsey Riding

Towns and localities
 Cherokee
 Clarkefield
 Darraweit Guim
 Kerrie
 Lancefield
 Monegeetta
 Mount William
 Riddells Creek
 Rochford
 Romsey*
 Springfield
 Tantarraboo 

* Council seat.

Population

* Estimate in the 1958 Victorian Year Book.

References

External links
 Victorian Places - Romsey Shire

Romsey